N.W.U is a 2016 Japanese-language album by South Korean rock band F.T. Island and is the band's seventh Japanese studio album. N.W.U is an acronym of 'Naite' (泣いて, to cry), 'Waratte' (笑って, to laugh), 'Utatte' (歌って, to sing). The album was released on 6 April 2016 and became top selling album that week in Japan's Tower Records.

The title track is "You Don't Know Who I Am" which was released on YouTube on March 18. Just like the previous album, members took part in writing the lyrics or composing music.

Track listing

References

F.T. Island albums
2015 albums
Japanese-language albums
FNC Entertainment albums